Bambusa glaucophylla  is a species of Bambusa bamboo.

Distribution

References 

glaucophylla